was a Japanese entomologist.

Born in Akashi, Hyōgo, Dr. Shōnen Matsumura established Japan's first course on entomology at Hokkaido University. The courses were both applied (on insects of importance in forestry and agriculture) and theoretical. He named over 1,200 species of Japanese insects and in 1926 he founded the entomological journal Insecta Matsumurana.  Matsumura wrote many scientific papers and books including 6,000 illustrated Insects of Japan-Empire (1931).  He died in Tokyo.

His collection is in Hokkaido University in Sapporo.

References
Howard, L. O. 1930 History of applied Entomology (Somewhat Anecdotal). Smiths. Miscell. Coll. 84 X+1-564.

External links
 DEI biografi Obituary list and portrait.
 Insecta matsumurana, the Journal of the Faculty of Agriculture, Hokkaido University
Shonen Matsumura, 1904- Nihon senchu zukai or Thousand insects of Japan Tokyo :[Keiseisha?],Meiji 37-40 [1904-1907] online (four volumes)

Japanese entomologists
Japanese lepidopterists
1872 births
1960 deaths